Nola clethrae, the sweet pepperbush nola moth, is a nolid moth (family Nolidae). The species was first described by Harrison Gray Dyar Jr. in 1899. It is found in North America.

The MONA or Hodges number for Nola clethrae is 8996.

References

Further reading

External links
 

clethrae
Articles created by Qbugbot
Moths described in 1899